Phileurus is a genus of rhinoceros beetles in the family Scarabaeidae. There are more than 20 described species in Phileurus.

Species
These 28 species belong to the genus Phileurus:

 Phileurus affinis Burmeister, 1847
 Phileurus angustatus Kolbe, 1910
 Phileurus bucculentus Ohaus, 1911
 Phileurus buchwaldi Ohaus, 1914
 Phileurus caribaeus Ratcliffe & Cave, 2015
 Phileurus carinatus Prell, 1914
 Phileurus didymus (Linnaeus, 1758)
 Phileurus endrodii Lamant-Voirin, 1995
 Phileurus enigmaticus Dupuis, 2004
 Phileurus excavatus Prell, 1911
 Phileurus hospes Burmeister, 1847
 Phileurus hospitus Prell, 1934
 Phileurus incurvatus Endrödi, 1978
 Phileurus kaszabi Endrödi, 1978
 Phileurus lecourti Dechambre, 1998
 Phileurus limicauda Prell, 1912
 Phileurus mundus Prell, 1914
 Phileurus patruus Endrödi, 1978
 Phileurus rufus Dechambre, 1998
 Phileurus schereri Endrödi, 1981
 Phileurus toulgoeti Dechambre, 1996
 Phileurus truncatus (Palisot de Beauvois, 1806) (triceratops beetle)
 Phileurus valgus (Olivier, 1789)
 Phileurus verus Endrödi, 1978
 Phileurus villaemagnae Dechambre, 1998
 Phileurus voirinae Endrödi, 1985
 Phileurus youngi Ratcliffe, 1988
 Phileurus zonianis Ratcliffe, 2011

References

Further reading

External links

 

Dynastinae
Articles created by Qbugbot